Monroy is a surname of French/English origin present in Spain and in other countries. This surname is the mix of mon ("my" in French) and roy ( variant of "king"). The precise meaning of Monroy would be "my king".

Ther Monroe variant has the letter e at the end instead of y, along de Monroy, which is a different surname. Similar surnames include Conroy and Fitzroy.

Alternatively, roy means red in Scottish, resulting in red mountain.

Notables 
 Beatrice Monroy (born 1953), Italian author and dramatist
 Bert Monroy (21st century), American artist
 Carlos Julio Arosemena Monroy (1919–2004), Vice President of Ecuador
 Crispin Castro Monroy (born 1936), Mexican politician
 Fernando Monroy (born 1980), Colombian footballer
 Jordy Monroy (born 1996), Armenian footballer
 Liza Monroy (born 1979), American novelist
 Rafael Monroy (1878–1915), martyr of The Church of Jesus Christ of Latter-day Saints
 Ramiro Ponce Monroy (20th century), Vice President of Guatemala

References

See also
 Monroe
 de Monroy
 Monro
 Munroe

English-language surnames
French-language surnames
Surnames of Scottish origin